The 1936 Drake Bulldogs football team was an American football team that represented Drake University in the Missouri Valley Conference (MVC) during the 1936 college football season. In its fourth season under head coach Vee Green, the team compiled a 6–4 record (3–2 against MVC opponents), finished third in the conference, and outscored its opponents by a total of 238 to 132.

Schedule

References

Drake
Drake Bulldogs football seasons
Drake Bulldogs football